Lianshan District is a district under the administration of the city of Huludao, Liaoning, People's Republic of China. It is located in the northeastern corner of Huludao prefecture, bordering Jinzhou.

Lianshan district encompasses the old district of Huludao city, and most of the city's industry along with the two main railway stations are located here. The Lianshan government headquarters is in the very center of Huludao, along Zhongyang Road.

Administrative divisions

There are 11 subdistricts, seven towns, and eight townships within the district.

Subdistricts:
Xinggong Subdistrict, Bohai Subdistrict, Huaji Subdistrict, Lianshan Subdistrict, Yilingba Subdistrict, Shuini Subdistrict, Zhanqian Subdistrict, Huagong Subdistrict, Shiyou Subdistrict, Jinjiao Subdistrict, Yangjiazhangzi Subdistrict, Yangjiazhangzi Economic and Technological Development Zone

Towns:
Taijitun, Si'erbao, Jinxing, Gangtun, Hongluoxian, Gaoqiao (Kaokiao), Gaoqiao Economic and Technological Development Zone, Xintaimen

Townships:
Shanshenmiaozi Township, Baimashi Township, Shaheying Township, Guchuyingzi Township, Yangjiao Township, Zhangxianggongtun Township, Tashan Township, Daxing Township

References

External links

County-level divisions of Liaoning
Huludao